Kim Hyong-jun (born November 26, 1949) is a North Korean politician and diplomat. Vice Chairman of the Workers' Party of Korea, member of the Politburo and member of the State Affairs Commission of North Korea. Former Ambassador to the Russian Federation.

Biography
He was born in North Hamgyong Province. He served as Ambassador to Lebanon since 2000. After that, he served as ambassador to Syria and resident in Damascus and Ambassador to Kuwait, Ambassador to Jordan, Ambassador to Qatar, and Ambassador to Bahrain. In January 2005, appointed foreign secretary. On October 29, 2013, he visited China by Koryo Air.

On January 1, 2020, North Korean news agency reported that significant personnel affairs of key officials and party vice-chairmen took place at the end of 2019 at the General Assembly of the Korean Labor Party Central Committee. He was appointed Ambassador to Russia on August 28, 2014 and served in that position until 2019, he coordinated the first meeting between General Secretary Kim Jong Un and the Russian President, Vladimir Putin in April 2019, was also nominated as a candidate for political affairs by being appointed the party's vice chairman and the party's international director. He is in charge of foreign affairs at the party and is expected to strengthen relations with Russia. In March 2020 he was seen voting in a meeting of the Politburo, a right reserved for full members only, and thus it was assumed he has become a full member. He was elected as a member of the State Affairs Commission at the 3rd meeting of the 14th convocation of the Supreme People's Assembly on April 12, 2020.

References

Ambassadors of North Korea to Russia
Members of the Supreme People's Assembly
1949 births
Living people
Vice Chairmen of the Workers' Party of Korea and its predecessors
People from North Hamgyong
21st-century North Korean politicians
Ambassadors of North Korea to Syria
Ambassadors of North Korea to Kuwait
Ambassadors of North Korea to Jordan
Ambassadors of North Korea to Qatar
Ambassadors of North Korea to Bahrain